Tirador ( or Velòdrom de Tirador) is a velodrome in Palma (Mallorca, Balearic Islands, Spain). It is an outdoor track cycling, opened in 1903 and was the most important velodrome built in Spain for six decades until the construction of the Velódromo de Anoeta (San Sebastián) in 1965. It was closed in 1973 and still existing, but no longer in use.

Since 2015 it is municipally owned, despite the fact that in recent years it has suffered a process of abandonment and progressive degradation. Its cataloging as a heritage element protected by the Palma City Council is in process and its rehabilitation is scheduled since 2022.

It has been one of the four cycling tracks in the city. Before it existed Son Espanyolet (1893–1911), then the current velodrome of Son Moix (1987) and finally the Palma Arena (2007).

History

Origins and construction 
Before the construction of the velodrome, this place had been owned by the carders' guild since the 14th century, and was the place where they washed, stretched and dried the clothings. It owes its name to the process of stretching the clothings (tirar being old catalan for 'streching', and tirador 'place where one stretches').

The Palma cyclist society Veloz Sport Balear was the driving force behind its construction. In the decade of 1890s the track cycling was beginning to take hold on the island and, with it, several slopes of poor quality and short route surfaced. Thus was born the first velodrome of the capital: Son Espanyolet, inaugurated in 1893. Like the rest, its construction was technically deficient (it was reopened twice more, to make up for its shortcomings) and the Veloz Sport Balear (one of the tenants of the track) thought of building a better quality enclosure, in addition to doing it on their own land guarantee its durability. For this he acquired some land (then outside the walls) of the city, near the torrent of sa Riera that formerly crossed the city.

The first Tirador stone was placed on 4 December 1898, but various circumstances (mainly lack of liquidity) interrupted the works on several occasions and prolonged them for almost five years, until which was inaugurated on 10 August 1903. After its inauguration of the activity in Son Espanyolet it completely ceased and shortly afterwards it disappeared.

First years 

Its inauguration was a national event and very soon Tirador became the reference track in Spain: The Spanish National of Track Cycling Sprint Championships was held there in 1904, evidence that had ceased to be disputed in 1897 for lack of an adequate track. At the same time it propitiated the birth of the Spanish National of Track Cycling Motor-Paced Championships in 1908, until then non-existent, since it was the most suitable track for the long-distance race dispute. Despite this, the cycling fans in Mallorca were going through a period of crisis and the amateur only responded to the big events, so during the rest of the year in the precinct was practiced all kinds of sports, especially the football.

Years of splendor 

The first years of Tirador contributed decisively to the consolidation and development of the majorcan cycling fans and the emergence of the first local Spain champions from 1913. Since then, the Spanish track has been dominated by majorcan cyclists for decades, especially in the medium-depth category. Of this first time they emphasized Simó Febrer Guixer and Miquel Bover Salom.

In 1920 the Veloz Sport Balear planned to replace the runway with a covered velodrome of greater capacity and functionality due to the success of the contested events, similar to Vélodrome d'Hiver of Paris (the Vél d'Hiv); but nothing happened and the track survived.

Between 1921 and 1925 Tirador was closed by a federative sanction, but upon reopening it regained its leadership in Spanish track cycling without problems. Successively they were appearing tracks in Spain that could be an alternative, like the Velodrome of Ciudad Lineal (Madrid), the velodrome annexed to Estadio Torrero (Zaragoza) or the velodrome of Sants (Barcelona), which hosted several editions of the Spanish National of Track Cycling Championships in 1920s and 1930s; but for various reasons all were of short duration, which left successively Tirador as the only reference.

During the Spanish Civil War Tirador was practically inactive, but suffered no material damage. At the end of the war, he recovered his activity with equal or greater force and, except for specific periods, during the 1940s and 1950s his cycling activity was constant at all levels. During these years the competition of foreign cyclists was scarce, first by the Second World War and then by the diplomatic isolation of the country. These years highlighted the majorcan runners Miquel Llompart and the own Bartomeu Flaquer.

During those years, new clues appeared in Campos (1935), Tortosa (1943), Mataró (1948) and others of shorter voyage, which hosted important events and official championships with assiduity, but without ever moving the Palma track as the main reference.

The victory of the majorcan Guillem Timoner in the 1955 World Championship held in Milan was an accolade for the track, which since then entered the circuit of great tracks of the world attracted by the local champion, regular runner on the track. This also coincided with a generation of majorcan cyclists who achieved international relevance and helped to consolidate the international range of Tirador like Pere Josep Gomila, Josep Escalas, Francesc Tortella or the 1965 world champion, Miquel Mas.

From the 1950s periodically projects were created to replace the velodrome with other facilities of greater capacity and functionality, once the worst postwar years were overcome and because of their gradual aging. In spite of this, nothing ever materialized and the track survived. The moment of greatest risk was the ambitious municipal project planned in 1960s by the mayor Màxim Alomar to cover the torrent of sa Riera that crosses the city and passed by the side of the track, but that was finally discarded due to its high cost.

Decay and closure 

The opening of the Velódromo de Anoeta (San Sebastián) in 1965, with the celebration of the World Championships the same year, marked the beginning of its decline. From then on Tirador ceased to be the reference track in Spain and entered a process of irreversible decadence. It stopped receiving first level tests from 1968 (it would still host official Spanish National Championships until 1972), its increasing deterioration and the generalized loss of interest in track competitions to the detriment of road cycling forced its definitive closure in March 1973. The last rehabilitation projects in collaboration with the Spanish or Balearic federations did not succeed and the construction of a new velodrome in the neighboring town of Algaida in 1975 buried it definitively in oblivion.

Since then its owners, a Veloz Sport Balear in low hours, dedicated the land to other uses. In 1999, paddle courts were built in the central space and a parking lot for the users, for which the runway was mutilated at the height of one of the cantons to allow access for the vehicles. And shortly after, another velodrome space was enabled as a municipal vehicle depot. Meanwhile, the track was abandoned and in a state of progressive degradation.

Expropriation and rehabilitation 

Since 1990s the municipal government planned the construction of a large green area in the torrent of Sa Riera called Sa Falca Verda (The Green Wedge). The design of the park, according to a project by Manuel Ribas i Piera and approved in 2002, contemplated the disappearance of the track, except for the Xalet of Gaspar Bennazar. In 2007 a first phase of the park was inaugurated, the so-called Parc de sa Riera (Sa Riera Park), and the expropriation procedures were continued for the second, among whose land was Tirador.

The judicial appeals filed by the affected owners and the delay in their resolution meant that the expropriation of the velodrome to be delayed until July 2015. However, the municipality was unable to act because the appraisal of the land and its subsequent payment were still pending a final judicial resolution. In short, Tirador was not entirely municipal until February 2019.

Meanwhile, the initial "Sa Falca Verda" project for the area had been scrapped. When the expropriation took place in 2015, the Palma City Council had replaced the initial design of Ribas i Piera with another that maintained the historic installation integrated in the future green area, plus the annexed site of the old Canòdrom Balear (an old greyhound track). The new design was in charge of the architect's studio Isabel Bennasar Félix and the green area was named Bosc Urbà (Urban Forest).

Due to the lack of maintenance until the expropriation of 2015 was final, the facilities underwent an accelerated process of degradation until they found themselves in an unfortunate state of neglect and dirt, in addition to the presence of squatters. Meanwhile, the velodrome rehabilitation project is in the drafting phase, awaiting the eviction of the squatters and seeking financing for its execution.

Description 

The track of Tirador has a rope of 333.33 m and 6 m wide, with two solid concrete banks (facing East and West) and bleachers on each side of the straight lines: main (North) and general (South), with capacity for approximately 2,000 spectators. Due to the elongated nature of the land acquired by the Veloz Sport Balear, the ellipse of the track is longer than normal to adapt to the perimeter of the farm: its straights have a longer route and their supers are more closed normal, in addition to more inclined to compensate for its pronounced curvature. As a result, the central space has an approximate area of 110 by 33.3 m.

In 1918 the architect Gaspar Bennazar added a building annexed to the Ponente canton in the form of a temple called es Xalet (the Chalet), covered tribune that served of cafeteria and terrace for the members and located in such a way that it offered a privileged perspective of the cyclist tests that were disputed there. In the 1970s it was renovated to house the social premises of the Veloz Sport Balear.

Since its closure in 1973 the work as a whole (track, steps and Xalet) was progressively degraded. Even so, the quality of the construction has meant that it is only superficial and that the whole structure remains intact. At the beginning of the 1990s a vial was opened that carried the wall and part of the entrance gardens, but did not affect the rest of the group.

Events 

From its opening to its closure the track hosted official events regularly and is probably the track that most official championships of Spain and Balearic Islands has hosted.

International competitions 

Tirador organized tests with foreign runners very soon, since the first one went back to 1906. Although the participation of very first figures had to wait for the 1950s, thanks to the successes of whoever was six times UCI Motor-paced World Championships between 1955 and 1965, the majorcan Guillem Timoner.

On several occasions he chose to host the old European Championship, and even a World Championship. But it never succeeded, mainly due to the lack of resources of the Royal Spanish Cycling Federation to confront the company and the superiority of other countries in the economic sphere, logistics and sports. Also other factors, such as the outbreak of World War I, prevented his candidacy for the 1915 European and the 1917 World Championship from prospering.

National competitions 

Since its inauguration, the velodrome has gained great prestige nationwide and regularly hosted the Spanish National Championships of sprint (since 1904) and Spanish National Championships of Motor-Paced (from 1908). Later he would do the same with the different modalities that arose, especially, from 1940s: Commercial Motor-Paced (1941) or Pursuit (1949), both in professional and amateur categories in all cases.

 Spain Championship of Sprint: 1904, 1914, 1916, 1919, 1920, 1921, 1931, 1934, 1935, 1939, 1940, 1941, 1944, 1947, 1948, 1950 and 1956.
 Spain Championship of Stayer Motor-paced: 1908 (*), 1913, 1914, 1915, 1916, 1917, 1918, 1919, 1920, 1921, 1926, 1927, 1929, 1931, 1934, 1940, 1941, 1943, 1945, 1946, 1947 and 1949.
 Spain Championship of Stayer Motor-paced (amateurs): 1972.
 Spain Championship of Commercial Motor-paced: 1941 (*), 1944, 1959, 1960, 1961, 1962, 1963, 1964, 1968, 1969, 1970 and 1972.
 Spain Championship of Commercial Motor-paced (amateurs): 1957 (*), 1958, 1959, 1960, 1963, 1964, 1968 and 1969.
 Spain Championship of individual Pursuit: 1949 (*), 1954, 1956, 1957, 1959, 1960, 1961, 1962, 1963 and 1964.
 Spain Championship of individual Pursuit (amateurs): 1958, 1959, 1960 and 1970.
 Spain Championship of Long-distance: 1941 (*), 1962 and 1963.
 Spain Championship of Long-distance (amateurs): 1964.

(*) first edition of the modality.

In the 1960s participated in the Intervelodromes Tournament, a competition in league format that faced teams attached to different tracks of the Spanish geography. The Balearic team, who ran in Tirador, won the first edition (1965).

Regional competitions 

The Balearic Championship of Sprint was held for its inauguration, and since then it has been regularly held there. Balearic Championship of Long-distance since its creation in 1912, as well as the rest of the modalities that emerged later as in the national case. In this case Tirador had to rival the profusion of tracks of Mallorca, especially with the velodrome of Campos.

 Balearic Championship of Sprint: 1903, 1905, 1906, 1908, 1912, 1913, 1916, 1917, 1919, 1920, 1925, 1926, 1932, 1935, 1939, 1944, 1945 and 1966.
 Balearic Championship of Sprint (amateurs): 1955 (*), 1956, 1957 and 1966.
 Balearic Championship of Long-distance: 1912 (*), 1913, 1917, 1919, 1920, 1925, 1926, 1928, 1931, 1938, 1939, 1942, 1944, 1956 and 1963.
 Balearic Championship of Long-distance (amateurs): 1954 (*), 1958, 1959 and 1972.
 Balearic Championship of Stayer Motor-paced: 1930 (*), 1931, 1932, 1933, 1934, 1935, 1936, 1941 and 1946.
 Balearic Championship of Commercial Motor-paced: 1941 (*), 1943, 1958, 1959, 1965, 1971 and 1972.
 Balearic Championship of Commercial Motor-paced (amateurs): 1956 (*), 1958, 1959, 1970 and 1971.
 Balearic Championship of Individual Pursuit: 1956 (*), 1957 and 1966.
 Balearic Championship of individual Pursuit (amateurs): 1955 (*), 1956, 1957, 1958, 1966, 1970 and 1972.
 Balearic Championship of Madison: 1966 (*) and 1972.
 Balearic Championship of Km Standing Start: 1972 (*).

(*) first edition of the modality.

Women's Cycling 

During the years of activity of Tirador the tests were carried out only by male cyclists. The exception was the visit of the Italian Alfonsina Strada, a pioneer of women's cycling in her time, who ran in 1926.

No official women's events were organized, since they began to be held at Mallorca starting 1979 and the regional championships on track starting the following year, when the velodrome had already been closed.

Other sports 

When the track was built, cycling was the only sport with certain roots; the practice of other sports was still scarce and there were hardly any spaces for their practice. This turned Tirador into the main sports space in which the majority of sports developed as they arrived on the island.

 Athletics. Since 1917 tests of pedestrism were disputed and also in the following years.
 Basketball. He started playing in 1938 on an outdoor track. The Veloz Sport Balear had a team federated between 1942 and 1945 that played in this space.
 Boxing. Although this sport was developed in other spaces of the city as of 1930s, some fighting was initially disputed on the track. The exhibition of the former heavyweight world champion, Jack Johnson, in 1917 stands out.
 Football. It came to Mallorca in 1903 and the central space of Tirador was the only existing playing field in Palma for years. The football section of the Veloz Sport Balear was the most powerful team on the island until the birth of RCD Mallorca in 1916 and the construction that same year of the first regulatory playing field. There he played his first game on Baleares FC (currently CD Atlético Baleares) in 1920.
 Motorcycling. Motorcycle tests were disputed, especially in the early years of the track.
 Other sports: Roller Skating, Tennis, Pigeon shooting.

Social acts 

Apart from the sports slope, the velodrome was a social meeting point as it is the main outdoor space suitable for mass events. Verbenas, concerts and shows were common, especially during the first third of the 20th century.

Patrimonial value 

Tirador is the oldest cycling track in Spain. It is followed by the velodrome of Campos (1935) and further away the tracks of Tortosa (1943) and Mataró (1948). At the moment it is the oldest sport enclosure that is conserved in Mallorca and one of the oldest in Spain.

At the world level, it is the twelfth oldest runway in the world (see List of oldest cycling tracks and velodromes), surpassed only by four United Kingdom velodromes (built between 1877 and 1900), six of France (between 1884 and 1897) and one of Hungary (1896). All of them are in use and, for this reason, they have been modernized to varying degrees for their use; unlike Tirador which is preserved almost as when it was inaugurated in 1903.

The frustration of projects for its extension or substitution (first) and the relative abandonment (after) in the 1950s were already qualified to the track as old-made that Tirador remained almost unchanged as is since its inauguration, except surface arrangements for its basic maintenance.

A series of articles in the press since 2014 made known the idiosyncrasy of the track and its value, social, historical and heritage. This helped to spread the importance of Tirador among those who were unaware of its existence, or recovered it for those old fans who believed that it had disappeared.

In 2018 a book was presented that compiles the history of the velodrome, from the origins to the present.

Cataloging 

Due to its historical value, since 2014 there have been initiatives to catalog the velodrome as a protected property.

 The Palma City Council, in the plenary session of 29 May 2014, unanimously approved a proposal for the heritage cataloging of the Xalet and the conservation of the track as a public space. 
 The Palma City Council announced on 20 October 2015 its cataloging and inclusion in the catalog of protected buildings, but it didn't take place.
 The Majorca Insular Council, in the plenary session of 16 October 2018, unanimously approved a similar proposal urging the City Council to catalog the site entirely; otherwise, the Insular Council will start the procedures for its patrimonial protection.
 The preservationist association Hispania Nostra included it on 26 November 2019 in its list of assets in danger of disappearance.
 The Palma City Council, in the plenary session of 19 December 2019, unanimously approved a proposal for the cataloging of the entire space.

 The Palma City Council in the plenary session on 30 April 2020 approved the provisional cataloging of the velodrome and definitively on 17 december 2020, unanimously by all municipal groups.

 Finally, the cataloging was official since its publication in the Official Gazette of the Balearic Islands (BOIB), on 18 February 2021.

Deadly accidents 

During the 70 years of activity of the velodrome there were a total of five fatalities:

 Antoni Parets Coll, 21 August 1927 when, as a motor-paced rider, he drove a cyclist Gaspar Pocoví in a race.
 Josep Nicolau i Balaguer nicknamed es Canó de Llorito (the cannon of Llorito), 18 November 1934 (26 years old), when the Spanish National of Track Cycling Motor-Paced Championships was run.
 Rafel Pou Sastre, 27 May 1936 (27 years old), when training after a motorcycle.
 Pere Bover Pons, son of Miquel Bover Salom es Sardiner, 15 May 1940 (18 years old), when he was fighting a race American style.
 Willy Lauwers (Belgium), 12 April 1959 (22 years old), in a motor-paced race.

See also 
 List of cycling tracks and velodromes

Bibliography 

 García Gargallo, Manuel: El velòdrom de tirador. Una història de l'esport a Mallorca. Palma: Illa Edicions, 2018. DL PM 147-2018.  (in Catalan)

References

External links 
 Article in Hispania Nostra
 Facebook page
 Documentary about the velodrome (IB3 Televisió)

Sport in Mallorca
Buildings and structures in Palma de Mallorca
Sports venues in the Balearic Islands
Velodromes in Spain
Sports venues completed in 1903
1903 establishments in Spain
1903 in Spanish sport